Hinduism is a minority religion in Andorra, where Christian forms the majority. It's also the third largest religion in the country, after Christianity and Islam. In 2015, there were 390 (0.5%) Hindus in Andorra. Majority of Hindus in the country are immigrants from India, who had mainly come for jobs and business purpose.

Demographics

References

External links 

 

 
Religion in Andorra